Hot Summer Night is a 1957 crime film directed by David Friedkin and starring Leslie Nielsen, Colleen Miller, and Edward Andrews.

Plot
Out of work but on his honeymoon, Bill Partain, a newspaper reporter, reads about a bank robbery in Sedalia, Missouri pulled off by notorious criminal Tom Ellis and his gang. Having once interviewed Ellis's girlfriend Ruth Childers for a Kansas City, Missouri paper, Partain figures an exclusive interview with Ellis could assure him of landing a new job.

Lying to his new wife Irene about where they are going, Bill drives them to a small Ozarks town where he believes Ruth is living. Townspeople are reluctant to help Bill locate her, and deputy Lou Follett warns him that almost everyone in the community is afraid of Ellis.

Bill finally finds Ruth, who remembers him favorably. She manages to arrange his being taken to Ellis by a young man named Kermit who is not in the gang, but sometimes works for him. Ellis grants him an interview, boasting of his crimes, to the consternation of gunman Elly Horn, who suddenly shoots both Ellis and Kermit. He also shoots his own gang member, Oren, by mistake.

Irene, left behind, is desperate to find her husband, who is now being held by Elly for a ransom of $50,000. She gets the address from Ruth, hitchhikes to Ellis's hideout and notifies the police, who arrive just in time to rescue Bill.

Cast
Leslie Nielsen as William Joel Partain
Colleen Miller as Irene Partain
Edward Andrews as Deputy Lou Follett
Jay C. Flippen as Oren Kobble
James Best as Kermit
Paul Richards as Elly Horn
Robert J. Wilke as Tom Ellis
Claude Akins as Truck Driver
Marianne Stewart as Ruth Childers
 Paul Wexler as the "Lean Man"

Box office
According to MGM records, the film earned $250,000 in the U.S. and Canada and $250,000 in other markets, resulting in a loss to the studio of $110,000.

References

External links

1957 films
1957 crime drama films
American crime drama films
American black-and-white films
Films scored by André Previn
Films about journalists
Metro-Goldwyn-Mayer films
1950s English-language films
1950s American films
Films set in the Ozarks
Films about honeymoon